Fly2Sky, formerly named Via Airways, is a Bulgarian passenger charter and ACMI aircraft operator based in Sofia. It operates in the Europe, Asia, CIS and African markets with a fleet of Airbus A320 family aircraft.

History
The airline was established and began flight operations in December 2016 as VIA Airways. In February 2019, it was re-branded as Fly2Sky.

Fleet

As of March 2023, Fly2Sky operates the following aircraft:

References

External links

Official website

Airlines of Bulgaria
Airlines established in 2017
Bulgarian companies established in 2017